Greatest Hits 2 is a compilation album of most of the Oak Ridge Boys' hits from 1980 to 1984. The album, their eleventh, was released on July 7, 1984. Unlike the first Greatest Hits album, released in 1980, this album had two new songs, "Make My Life with You" and "Everyday", replacing "Bobbie Sue" and "So Fine", both of which were 1982 hits, from the album Bobbie Sue.

Track listing
"Elvira" (Dallas Frazier) (3:46) From the album Fancy Free
"Ozark Mountain Jubilee" (Roger Murrah/Scott Anders) (3:21) From the album Deliver
"Love Song" (Steve Runkle) (3:53) From the album American Made
"(I'm Settin') Fancy Free" (Jimbeau Hinson/Don August) (3:42) From the album Fancy Free
"Everyday" (Dave Loggins/J.D. Martin) (4:03) New song, previously unreleased
"Beautiful You" (Dave Hanner) (4:10) From the album Together
"Thank God for Kids" (Eddy Raven) (2:57) From the album Christmas
"American Made" (Bob DiPiero/Pat McManus) (2:40) from the album American Made
"Make My Life with You" (Gary Burr) (4:05) New song, previously unreleased
"I Guess It Never Hurts to Hurt Sometimes" (Randy VanWarmer) (4:04) From the album Deliver

Charts

Weekly charts

Year-end charts

Singles

References

1984 greatest hits albums
The Oak Ridge Boys albums
Albums produced by Ron Chancey
MCA Records compilation albums